Luis Varela may refer to:

 Luis Varela (footballer) (born 1941), Uruguyan footballer
 Luis Varela (wrestler) (born 1972), Venezuelan wrestler
  (born 1943), Spanish actor
 Luis Rodríguez-Varela (1768–1826), early Filipino nationalist